St-Boniface (or Saint-Boniface) is a city ward and neighbourhood in Winnipeg. Along with being the centre of the Franco-Manitoban community, it ranks as the largest francophone community in Western Canada.

It features such landmarks as the St. Boniface Cathedral, Boulevard Provencher, the Provencher Bridge, Esplanade Riel, St. Boniface Hospital, the Université de Saint-Boniface, and the Royal Canadian Mint.

The area covers east-central and southeast Winnipeg, including  ('Old St. Boniface'), and consists of the neighbourhoods of Norwood West, Norwood East, Windsor Park, Niakwa Park, Niakwa Place, Southdale, Southland Park, Royalwood, Sage Creek, and Island Lakes, among others, plus a large industrial area. The ward is represented by Matt Allard, a member of Winnipeg City Council, and also corresponds to the neighbourhood clusters of St-Boniface East and West. The population was 58,520 according to the Canada 2016 Census.

History

Succeeding cultures of indigenous peoples lived in the area for thousands of years before European exploration. It is an area of historic Ojibwe occupation.

Fur traders and European mercenaries hired by Thomas Douglas, Lord Selkirk, to protect his fledgling Red River Colony were among the area's first European settlers. With the founding of a Roman Catholic mission in 1818, St. Boniface began its role in Canadian religious, political and cultural history: as mother parish for many French settlements in Western Canada; as the birthplace of Louis Riel and fellow Métis who struggled to obtain favourable terms for Manitoba's entry into Confederation; and as a focus of resistance to controversial 1890 legislation to alter Manitoba's school system and abolish French as an official language in the province (see Manitoba Schools Question).

French-speaking religious orders, including the Sisters of Charity of Montreal (better known as the Grey Nuns), who arrived in 1844, founded the early educational, cultural and social-service institutions, such as St. Boniface Hospital, the first in Western Canada. Early French-speaking missionary Catholic priests in the region founded the Collège de Saint-Boniface (dating to 1818) to teach Latin and general humanities to the local boys; it is now the Université de Saint-Boniface.

St-Boniface was incorporated as a town in 1883 and as a city in 1908.

The early economy was oriented to agriculture. Industrialization arrived in the early 20th century. The  Union Stockyards, developed 1912–13, became the largest livestock exchange in Canada and a centre of the meat-packing and -processing industry. By the early 1900s, numerous light and heavy industries were established. Redevelopment of the Stockyards site as a housing and retail area by Olexa Developments of Calgary is scheduled for 2020. It is planned that in the first phase of the development, 600 housing units are to be constructed.

In the 1950s and 1960s the neighbourhoods of Windsor Park and Southdale developed into residential areas. In 2016 Windsor Park had a population of 10,050 and Southdale had a population of 6,450.

In 1971, Saint-Boniface was amalgamated, along with several neighbouring communities, into the City of Winnipeg. As one of the larger French communities outside Québec, it has often been a centre of struggles to preserve French-Canadian language and culture within Manitoba.

Places and culture
The St-Boniface area covers the east-central and southeastern part of Winnipeg, including  ('Old St. Boniface').

It also includes the Canadian National Railway's Symington Yards, a major rail-handling facility; and the Union Stockyards, which were once the largest of their kind in Canada.

Neighbourhoods
The St-Boniface city ward, represented by City Councillor Matt Allard, is composed of the following neighbourhoods: Archwood, Dufresne, Central St-Boniface, Holden, Island Lakes, Maginot, The Mint, Mission Industrial, Niakwa Park, Niakwa Place, North St-Boniface, Norwood East, Norwood West, Southdale, Stock Yards, and Windsor Park.

The ward mostly corresponds to the community area of St-Boniface and neighbourhood clusters of St-Boniface East and West, which are used by Statistics Canada for demographic purposes. However, while the community area—or clusters—include all of the neighbourhoods of the city ward, it also extends eastward past Lagimodière Boulevard to Plessis Road, thereby including the neighbourhoods of Dugald, Royalwood, Sage Creek, Southland Park, St-Boniface Industrial Park, and Symington Yards.

Culture

St-Boniface is home to the Festival du Voyageur, held annually in February outdoors at Whittier Park and Fort Gibraltar, as well as Cinémental, the city's annual francophone film festival.

Landmarks
The area features such landmarks as the Boulevard Provencher, Esplanade Riel, Fort Gibraltar, Lagimodière-Gaboury Park, the Provencher Bridge, the Royal Canadian Mint, St. Boniface Cathedral (including the grave of Louis Riel in its churchyard), St-Boniface Hospital, and the Université de Saint-Boniface.

The House of Archbishop Alexandre-Antonin Taché, which is now used for administrative purposes by the Archdiocese of St. Boniface, is one of the oldest stone buildings in western Canada.

Notable people
Louis Bétournay – lawyer and judge
Mud Bruneteau – professional hockey player
Len Cariou – Broadway theatre actor
Earl Dawson – politician and president of the Manitoba and Canadian Amateur Hockey Associations
Bryan Fustukian – radio disc jockey, concert promoter and performer
Tony Gingras – right-winger for the Winnipeg Victorias
Butch Goring – professional hockey player
George R. D. Goulet – best-selling Métis author
Bob Hunter – Greenpeace co-founder
Ambroise-Dydime Lépine Métis military leader during the Red River Rebellion
Earl Mindell – writer and nutritionist
Dorothy Patrick – actress
Jim Peebles - cosmologist and Nobel Prize winner
Louis Riel – Métis leader and founder of Manitoba
Sara Riel – first Métis member of the Grey Nuns
Gabrielle Roy – French language author
Lucille Starr – (née Savoie) singer
Jonathan Toews – professional hockey player

Media
Winnipeg's three Francophone radio stations, CKXL-FM, CKSB-10-FM and CKSB-FM, are located in St-Boniface and are licensed there, a legacy of when St-Boniface was a separate city.

The French-language weekly newspaper La Liberté is also based in St-Boniface.

Sports
St-Boniface is represented by the St. Boniface Riels hockey team which plays in the Manitoba Major Junior Hockey League (MMJHL). The St-Boniface Riels were founded in 1971. They play at the Southdale Arena and have won five MMJHL championships: 1971–1972, 1972–1973, 1984–1985, 1985–1986, 2014–2015.

Further reading
 Huel, Raymond Joseph Armand. (2003). Archbishop A.-A. Taché of St-Boniface: the "good fight" and illusive vision. Edmonton [Alta.]. University of Alberta Press.

Notes

References

External links

Tourisme Riel
Saint Boniface Heritage Centre

French communities
Neighbourhoods in Winnipeg
Shopping districts and streets in Canada
Manitoba communities with majority francophone populations
Former municipalities now in Winnipeg
 
St._Boniface